In mathematics, Erdős space is a topological space named after Paul Erdős, who described it in 1940. Erdős space is defined as a subspace  of the Hilbert space of square summable sequences, consisting of the sequences whose elements are all rational numbers.

Erdős space is a totally disconnected, one-dimensional topological space. If the set of all homeomorphisms of the Euclidean space  (for ) that leave invariant the set  of rational vectors is endowed with the compact-open topology, it becomes homeomorphic to the Erdős space.

Erdős space also surfaces in complex dynamics via iteration of the function . The set of finite endpoints is homeomorphic to Erdős space .

See also

References 

Topological spaces